Anbai Thedi is a 1974 Indian Tamil-language film, directed by Muktha Srinivasan. The film stars Sivaji Ganesan and Jayalalithaa. It was released on 13 November 1974.

Plot

Cast 
Sivaji Ganesan as Ramu
Jayalalithaa as Rani
C. R. Vijayakumari as Janaki
Major Sundarrajan as Rajasekar
Srikanth as Suresh
Shubha as Radha
R. S. Manohar as Mannaru
Cho as Virunthali Mama
Manorama as Annam
Senthamarai as Veerasamy
K. Kannan as Nagappan
C. I. D Sakunthala (guest role)
S. N. Parvathy
Baby Indra as Indra Rajasekar's daughter

Production 
Muktha Srinivasan has stated that before filming, Jayalalithaa "used to be ready with make up and costumes on the set."

Soundtrack 
The music was composed by M. S. Viswanathan, with lyrics by Kannadasan.

Reception 
Kanthan of Kalki appreciated Thooyavan's dialogues, Srinivasan's direction, the film's colour and cast performances.

References

External links 
 

1970s Tamil-language films
1973 films
Films directed by Muktha Srinivasan
Films scored by M. S. Viswanathan